Vaşa (also, Vasha and Vosha) is a village and municipality in the Ismayilli District of Azerbaijan. It has a population of 165.

References 

Populated places in Ismayilli District